The men's tournament in ice hockey at the 2018 Winter Olympics was held in Gangneung, South Korea between 14 and 25 February 2018. Twelve countries qualified for the tournament; eight of them did so automatically by virtue of their ranking by the International Ice Hockey Federation, one, South Korea, automatically qualified as hosts, while the three others took part in a qualification tournament.

After five consecutive Olympic tournaments in which the National Hockey League (the world's premier professional league) allowed its players to participate in the Olympics and adjusted its schedule to accommodate the tournament, the NHL announced in 2017 that it would prohibit any player under NHL contract, including those not actually playing for an NHL team, from participating in the Olympics. The NHL secured the cooperation of the International Ice Hockey Federation and the IOC ensuring that nations would not be allowed to ask NHL players to participate.

Unlike the NHL, the vast majority of European leagues accommodated an Olympic break, headlined by Russia-based KHL's 33-day break, Sweden-based Swedish Hockey League's 14-day break, Switzerland-based National League's 25-day break, German-based Eishockey Liga's 26-day break, Czech Republic-based Extraliga's 18-day break, and Slovakia-based Tipsport liga's 14-day break. Conversely, Finland-based SM-liiga did not accommodate a break, but allowed its top players to leave the clubs and participate in the Olympic Games.

The Russian national team, competing under the name of the Olympic Athletes from Russia (OAR), won the gold medal, defeating the German national team with a score of 4–3 in overtime in the final. For Germany, winning the silver medal was the greatest achievement in the history of German ice hockey and the first medal win since the 1976 Winter Olympics in Innsbruck, when West Germany won the bronze medal.

Defending champion Canada secured third place and bronze, defeating Czech Republic 6–4 in the bronze medal game.

Venue

Qualification

Canada, Russia, Sweden, Finland, United States, Czech Republic, Switzerland, and Slovakia qualified as the top eight teams in the IIHF World Ranking in 2015.

South Korea qualified as host team. To field a competitive team, the South Korean government agreed to grant one American and six Canadian hockey players that were playing in Korean leagues dual citizenship to make them eligible for the national team. The remaining three teams qualified from qualification tournaments.

Qualified teams

Notes

Rosters

Match officials
14 referees and 14 linesmen were selected for the tournament.

Referees
 Oliver Gouin
 Brett Iverson
 Jan Hribik
 Antonín Jeřábek
 Aleksi Rantala
 Anssi Salonen
 Roman Gofman
 Konstantin Olenin
 Daniel Stricker
 Tobias Wehrli
 Jozef Kubuš
 Linus Öhlund
 Mark Lemelin
 Timothy Mayer

Linesmen
 Nathan Vanoosten
 Vít Lederer
 Miroslav Lhotský
 Hannu Sormunen
 Sakari Suominen
 Lukas Kohlmüller
 Gleb Lazarev
 Alexander Otmakhov
 Nicolas Fluri
 Roman Kaderli
 Jimmy Dahmen
 Henrik Pihlblad
 Fraser McIntyre
 Judson Ritter

Preliminary round
All times are local (UTC+9).

Tiebreak criteria
In each group, teams will be ranked according to the following criteria:
Number of points (three points for a regulation-time win, two points for an overtime or shootout win, one point for an overtime or shootout defeat, no points for a regulation-time defeat);
In case two teams are tied on points, the result of their head-to-head match will determine the ranking;
In case three or four teams are tied on points, the following criteria will apply (if, after applying a criterion, only two teams remain tied, the result of their head-to-head match will determine their ranking):
Points obtained in head-to-head matches between the teams concerned;
Goal differential in head-to-head matches between the teams concerned;
Number of goals scored in head-to-head matches between the teams concerned;
If three teams remain tied, result of head-to-head matches between each of the teams concerned and the remaining team in the group (points, goal difference, goals scored);
Place in 2017 IIHF World Ranking.

Group A

Group B

Group C

Ranking after preliminary round
Following the completion of the preliminary round, all teams will be ranked 1D through 12D. To determine this ranking, the following criteria will be used in the order presented:
higher position in the group
higher number of points
better goal difference
higher number of goals scored for
better 2017 IIHF World Ranking.

Playoff round

Bracket

Qualification playoffs
The four highest-ranked teams (1D–4D) received byes and were deemed the home team in the quarterfinals as they were seeded to advance, with the remaining eight teams (5D–12D) playing qualification playoff games as follows. The losers of the qualification playoff games received a final ranking of 9 through 12 based on their preliminary round ranking.

Quarterfinals
Following the quarterfinal games, the winning teams were re-ranked F1 through F4, with the winner of 1D vs. E4 re-ranked as F1, the winner of 2D vs. E3 re-ranked as F2, the winner of 3D vs. E2 re-ranked as F3, and the winner of 4D vs. E1 re-ranked as F4. The losers of the quarterfinal round games received a final ranking of 5 through 8 based on their preliminary round ranking.

Semifinals

Bronze medal game

Gold medal game

Final ranking

Statistics

Scoring leaders
List shows the top ten skaters sorted by points, then goals.

GP = Games played; G = Goals; A = Assists; Pts = Points; +/− = Plus/minus; PIM = Penalties in minutes; POS = Position
Source: IIHF.com

Leading goaltenders
Only the top five goaltenders, based on save percentage, who have played at least 40% of their team's minutes, are included in this list.
TOI = Time on ice (minutes:seconds); SA = Shots against; GA = Goals against; GAA = Goals against average; Sv% = Save percentage; SO = ShutoutsSource: IIHF.com

Awards
Media All-Stars
Goaltender:  Vasily Koshechkin
Defencemen:  Maxim Noreau,  Vyacheslav Voynov
Forwards:  Ilya Kovalchuk,  Pavel Datsyuk,  Eeli Tolvanen
Most Valuable Player:  Ilya Kovalchuk
Best players selected by the directorate:
Best Goaltender:  Danny aus den Birken
Best Defenceman:  Vyacheslav Voynov
Best Forward:  Nikita Gusev
Source: IIHF.com

References

External links
Official IIHF website

 
Men's tournament